General Order No. 28 was a military decree made by Maj. Gen. Benjamin Butler during the American Civil War. Following the Battle of New Orleans, Butler established himself as military commander of that city on May 1, 1862. Many of the city's inhabitants were strongly hostile to the Federal government, and many women in particular expressed this contempt by insulting Union troops.

Accordingly, on May 15, Butler issued an order to the effect that any woman insulting or showing contempt for any officer or soldier of the United States should be "treated as a woman of the town plying her avocation," the solicitation of prostitution. The order had no sexual connotation, but it permitted soldiers not to treat women performing such acts as ladies. For example, if a woman punched a soldier, he could punch her back. Known as the Woman's Order, it was very controversial both at home and abroad, as women throughout New Orleans interpreted it as Butler legalizing rape. The general dislike over No. 28 even went so far as people printing his portrait on the bottom of chamber pots, and was a cause of Butler's removal from command of New Orleans on December 16, 1862.

Text

Women in the Confederacy
With many men away from home fighting for the Confederacy, women sacrificed "physical conveniences and comforts... for what was considered a holy cause" by becoming the front lines of war morale. They inspired troops and kept up morale by retaining "an uncritical faith in the soldiers and a mystical faith in Providence" which they expressed through letters to soldiers and personal diaries. To add to their burden, women had to figure out how to support themselves without men to provide for them. Many women "leaped from their spheres" to assume duties and roles that were almost always performed by men. Women became managers of farms or plantations or sought employment outside of the home in order to provide for themselves and their families.

The plight was observed by not only personal correspondence and diaries but also demonstrations known as bread riots. The Richmond Bread Riot occurred on April 2, 1863. Women were distressed due to the food shortages, the failure of relief efforts, and the general struggle of independence in a world based on paternalism and benevolence. The women of Richmond raided stores on Cary Street and Main Street and interrupted only by Confederate President Jefferson Davis, who allowed them to keep the goods they stole from the stores.

By the end of the war, Confederate women had made sacrifices that were compared to the "stern resolution and self-abnegation of Rome and Lacedaemon." They willingly deprived themselves of things such as food and clothing to help the suffering troops. In 1864, Augusta Jane Evans published a novel, Macaria; or, Alters of Sacrifice, about a woman who discovered her usefulness in the Confederate cause and likened her to the woman "who sacrificed herself on the altar of the gods in order to save Athens time of war." To many white Confederate women, the Confederacy was their Athens for which they would sacrifice all.

The extreme sacrifice made by white Confederate women is one of the tenets of the Lost Cause memory of the Civil War. Women are to be revered for their sacrifices and identified for their important roles in a society dominated by paternalism and the patriarchal power structure.

Union control of New Orleans
Major General Benjamin F. Butler occupied the city of New Orleans on May 1, 1862. The residents of New Orleans, especially the women, did not take Butler's appointment as military general very well. Butler's troops faced "all manner of verbal and physically symbolic insults" from women, including obvious physical avoidance such as crossing the street or leaving a streetcar to avoid a Union soldier, being spat upon, and having chamber pots being dumped upon them. The Union troops were offended by the treatment, and after two weeks of occupation, Butler had had enough. He issued his General Order No. 28, which instructed Union soldiers to treat any woman who offended a soldier "as a woman of the town plying her avocation."

Reactions
The order was highly publicized and heavily criticized both domestically and overseas. Butler became known as "The Beast." The British House of Lords called it a "most heinous proclamation" and regarded it as "one of the grossest, most brutal, and must unmanly insults to every woman in New Orleans." The Earl of Carnarvon proclaimed the imprisonment of women a "more intolerable tyranny than any civilized country in our day [has] been subjected to." The Saturday Review criticized Butler's rule, accusing him of "gratifying his own revenge" and likening him to an uncivilized dictator:

If he had possessed any of the honourable feeling which is usually associated with a soldier's profession, he would not have made war on women. If he had even been endowed with the ordinary magnanimity of a Red Indian, his revenge would have been satiated before now. It required not only the nature of a savage, but of a very mean and pitiful kind of savage, to be induced by indignation at a woman's smile to inflict an imprisonment so degrading in its character as that which seems to constitute his favourite punishment, and accompanied by privations so cruel.... It is only a pity that so unadulterated a barbarian should have got hold of an Anglo-Saxon name.

Southern women were highly offended by the order. Catherine Ann Devereux Edmonston, wife of North Carolina plantation owner Patrick Muir Edmonston, expressed horrified shock in her diary. She referred to it as "cold blooded barbarity" and expressed extreme disdain for Butler and all other Northerners: "We no longer will hold any intercourse with you, ye puritanical, deceitful race." Edmonston even went so far as to blame Butler's wife for creating the order as a show of her "ferocity against the real ladies of New Orleans" after she was rejected from New Orleans society.

Clara Solomon, a 17-year-old Jewish girl from New Orleans, expressed similar feelings. She found the order unnecessary and offensive, asking "what anyway could a woman's taunts do to" the Union soldiers. John T. Monroe, Mayor of New Orleans, protested the Woman's Order by refusing to enact the order and was swiftly imprisoned at Fort Jackson.

Butler tried to defend his command in New Orleans in a letter to the Boston Journal, claiming "the devil had entered the hearts of the women of [New Orleans]... to stir up strife" and falsely claimed that the order had been very effective. In essence, he said his order stated the effective way to deal with a defiant Confederate-sympathizing woman was to treat her as undignified as a woman of the town, and thus to ignore her. However, some thought the language of the order was too ambiguous and feared that Union troops would treat New Orleans women like prostitutes in regards to soliciting them for sex and perhaps even rape.

Eugenia Levy Phillips
Eugenia Levy Phillips was one woman who was imprisoned under the Woman's Order. Phillips was a good family friend of Clara Solomon, who expressed great shock at her imprisonment for "laughing and mocking" at the remains of Union Lieutenant George Coleman De Kay, Jr. during his funeral procession. Catherine Edmonston sympathized with Phillips and the "foul wrong" and "horrible outrage" placed against her. She was imprisoned at Ship Island, where she was "confined; with one servant; soldiers rations; & to have no communication." Her harsh treatment as a prisoner turned her into a martyr instead of an example of Butler's power. After the war, Phillips protested the way that she was portrayed as a spy, calling the accusations "shameful" and condemning.

Aftermath
Butler claimed that the order was effective in quieting the women of New Orleans, but he was only partially correct. Women in New Orleans still presented a very real political and military threat to the imposing Union Army, despite only a small number of women continuing to be politically active after the order and the arrest of Phillips.

Butler was removed from his command of New Orleans on December 16, 1862. The international attention garnered from the order contributed to his removal from New Orleans, as did his threats aimed at foreign consuls.

References

Louisiana in the American Civil War
General orders
Benjamin Butler
19th century in New Orleans
Social history of the American Civil War